Metro Ethernet Routing Switch 8600 or MERS 8600 is a modular chassis router and/or switch manufactured by Nortel now acquired by Ciena.  The MERS 8600 supports the Provider Backbone Bridges (PBB),  Provider Backbone Transport (PBT) technologies and carrier class Operations Administration & Maintenance (OAM) tools.

Configurable as a 1.440 Terabit Switch cluster using SMLT and RSMLT protocols, cluster failover (normally less than 100 millisecond).

BT uses the MERS 8600 PBB/PBT technologies in its 21st Century Network (21CN) and India has selected this platform for the most extensive IP network ever deployed by an international airport in India.  

The MERS 8600 has 3 chassis options
 8006, 6-slot chassis for backbones of low density or high space premium
 8010, 10-slot chassis for high availability and high scalability
 8010CO, 10-slot NEBS-compliant chassis.

The chassis can be configured with one or two CPU modules (8692SF), and is normally configured with two or three load balancing power supplies.

Modules

CPU Modules 
 8692omSF Switch Fabric and CPU 8692 with Expansion Mezzanine card, Supports 50 ms fail-over on NNI trunks with MultiLink Trunking
 8692omSF Switch Fabric
 8691 omSF Switch Fabric and CPU Module

10 Gigabit Ethernet 
 8683 XLR, 3 ports 10 Gigabit Ethernet XFP (LAN PHY only)

Packet Over SONET 
 8683POSM, POS Baseboard supports up to 6 OC-3 or 3 OC-12 ports

VPN Modules 
 8668 VPN Module

Gigabit Ethernet 
 8630 GBR, 30 ports 1000 BaseX small form factor pluggable interfaces (SX, LX, CWDM, TX)
 8608GBM, 8-port Gigabit Ethernet, GBIC-based
 8608GTM, 8 ports 1000BASE-T, fixed Gigabit Ethernet

100/10 Megabit Ethernet
 8632TXM, 32 ports 10/100 plus 2 GBIC ports
 8648TXM, 48 10/100TX ports

See also 
 Ciena
 Metro Ethernet
 Wavelength-division multiplexing
 Provider Backbone Bridges
 Provider Backbone Transport

References

External links

 Metro Ethernet Routing Switch 8600 -Broken
 Resilient Terabit Cluster - Always on Networking - Broken

Ciena
Networking hardware
Nortel products
Nortel protocols